Neopithecops is a genus of butterflies in the family Lycaenidae.

Species
 Neopithecops iolanthe Eliot & Kawazoé, 1983 Torres Strait Islands, Cape York, Trobriand Islands, Batjan
 Neopithecops sumbanus Eliot & Kawazoé, 1983 Indonesia Sumba, Tanahjampea, Dammer Island
 Neopithecops umbretta Grose-Smith, 1895 Indonesia Lesser Sunda Islands, Tanahjampea, Sula Islands, Maluku Islands, Obi Island
 Neopithecops zalmora (Butler, 1870)
 Neopithecops sp. – undescribed

References
"Neopithecops Distant, 1884" at Markku Savela's Lepidoptera and some other life forms

Polyommatini
Butterflies of Indonesia
Lepidoptera of Papua New Guinea
Fauna of the Lesser Sunda Islands
Lycaenidae genera